Charles Hurley may refer to:

 Charles A. Hurley, former CEO of Mothers Against Drunk Driving
 Charles F. Hurley (1893–1943), Governor of Massachusetts
 Charlie Hurley (born 1936), Irish footballer
 Charlie Hurley (Irish republican) (died 1921), Irish Republican Army officer